The Taiwanese Ambassador to Paraguay is the official representative of the Republic of China to the Republic of Paraguay.

List of representatives

See also 
Paraguay–Taiwan relations

References 

Paraguay
China